René Hippolyte Béclu (3 February 1881, Paris – "Mort pour la France" 17 January 1915, Riaville (Meuse)) was a French sculptor. 

He was born in Paris, studied under Antonin Mercié and Hector Lemaire, and is now best known for his work Le Secret (The Secret) in the Parc de la Tête d'Or, Lyons, France.

References 
 Explication des ouvrages de peinture, sculpture, architecture, gravure, et lithographie des artistes vivants exposés au Grand palais des Champs-Élysées, Imprimerie Paul Dupont, Paris, 1 May 1908, page 264. 

1881 births
1915 deaths
20th-century French sculptors
20th-century French male artists
French male sculptors
French military personnel killed in World War I